José "Pepito" Rodríguez Carballeira (December 14, 1896 – October 24, 1954) was a Spanish child prodigy pianist and eventual master violinist.

Origins
Pepito was born to a liberal family of Ferrol, his mother was Josefa Rodríguez Carballeira and having no known father, his birth certificate has the family name of his mother, which she never used, naming the boy with the last name of his grandfather. After Josefa went to Madrid, his aunt Aurora took care of him and taught him to play piano.

Career beginning 
Arriola's remarkable ability was first discovered at the age of two and a half. The story spread by his mother says that she had received a composition from a friend which she played frequently on the home piano. One morning, upon hearing the piece played with accuracy and confidence, Arriola's mother entered the room containing the piano and was astounded when she discovered that her son was responsible for the skilled rendition. The young musician, without any formal or informal instruction, began his career as a pianist, at times playing pieces he had heard and at other times creating original compositions. After his mother noticed the child's abilities, she took him with her to Madrid and his career as a concert pianist began.

Performances 
On December 4, 1899, not yet three years old, Pepito Arriola gave his first public performance to an audience of music critics and musicians. Just after his third birthday on December 26 of the same year, Arriola held his second concert in Royal Palace of Madrid in front of King and Queen playing six original compositions.  Arriola would go on to become a great violinist as well, impressing the whole of Europe with his later great concerts in the German city of Leipzig and in the Russian capital of St. Petersburg .

In 1911 Arriola appeared at the Elitch Theatre in Denver, Colorado, as reported by Mary Elitch Long: "Denver musicians were given the opportunity to hear Pepito Ariola, the famous boy pianist."

Original compositions 
Arriola at the age of three, could read neither music nor written language and thus his process of composition was highly unconventional. He would sometimes use a blank piece of paper, indicating the nature of the piece (sonata, waltz, etc.) with a symbol at the top followed by arbitrary lines and notes which was the written music for the piece. Afterward, he is described as setting the paper down in front of him saying “I will play that” and proceeding to improvise remarkably well. His pieces were described as having a “richness of astonishing expression” ranging from the tragic to the merry.

Complete works
Aurora habanera 1898
Impresiones nocturnas 1916
Hommage à Manuel de Falla/Homenaje a Falla 1942

After his death 12 additional scores were found. They were written in Barcelona after his return to Spain in 1946:
Divertimento concertante 1946
Tres textos cervantinos voice and orchestra, 1946
Aqui lloró Don Quixote, 1947
Tres textos cervantinos for 2 pianos, 1947
Concerto para trompa horn concert, 1948
Sehilcht Weise1948
Song 1948
Don Quixote in DM 1949
Seis poesías de Antonio Machado Baritone and orchestra
Pequena serenata para cello y piano 1951
Concertino piano e orquestra 1953
Impresiones Argentinas

Bibliography
Pepito Arriola, entre mito y realidad, Eva ocampo
De Pepito a hildegart, Francisco Martínez López

References

External links
 The Story Of Pepito Arriola Told By Himself
 The Story of a Wonder Child

1896 births
1954 deaths
20th-century pianists
20th-century Spanish musicians
Spanish pianists